The Harrisburg Military Post is an historic National Guard armory complex and national historic district which is located in Harrisburg, Dauphin County, Pennsylvania. It serves as the headquarters for the 28th Infantry Division. 

It was added to the National Register of Historic Places in 1991.

History and architectural features
The complex consists of ten buildings, six of which are contributing to the historic place. The contributing buildings were built between 1929 and 1938, and are a three-story, French Renaissance-style Administration Building, which was erected in 1938, a warehouse, which was built in 1933, a Tudor Revival-style gun shed, which was built in 1930, Stable No. 4, which was built in 1932, Stable Nos. 2 and 3, which were erected in 1930, and Stable No. 1, which was built in 1929.

This complex was added to the National Register of Historic Places in 1991.

References

Buildings and structures in Harrisburg, Pennsylvania
Armories on the National Register of Historic Places in Pennsylvania
Historic districts in Harrisburg, Pennsylvania
Tudor Revival architecture in Pennsylvania
Government buildings completed in 1938
Buildings and structures in Dauphin County, Pennsylvania
Historic districts on the National Register of Historic Places in Pennsylvania
National Register of Historic Places in Harrisburg, Pennsylvania